The Symposium on Principles of Self-Organization was held at Allerton House on 8–9 June 1960. It was a key conference in the development of cybernetics and was in many ways a continuation of the Macy Conferences. it was organised by Heinz von Foerster through the Biological Computer Laboratory based at University of Illinois at Urbana-Champaign. It was sponsored by the Information Systems Branch of the U.S. Office of Naval Research.

Participants
There were 38 male participants:

Department of Electrical Engineering at the University of Illinois
This was the host organisation.

 Murray Babcock
 Heinz von Foerster
 Alfred Inselberg
 Lars Löfgren
 Albert Mullin
 Albert Novikoff
 Paul Weston
 George Zopf

Other participants from Illinois

 John Bowman, Technological Institute, Northwestern University
 Scott Cameron, Armour Research Foundation
 Peter Greene, Committee on Mathematical Biology, University of Chicago
 Friedrich Hayek, Committee on Social Thought, University of Chicago
 George Jacobi, Armour Research Foundation
 John R. Platt, Department of Physics, University of Chicago
 Stephen Sherwood, Illinois State Psychiatric Institute, Chicago
 A Shimbel, Illinois State Psychiatric Institute, Chicago

Cambridge Massachusetts 

 Manuel Blum,  W. S. McCulloch Room, Massachusetts Institute of Technology (MIT)
 Jack Cowan, W. S. McCulloch Room, MIT
 Jerome I. Elkind, Bolt, Beranek, Newman Inc.
 Warren McCulloch, W. S. McCulloch Room, MIT
 Leo Verbeek, W. S. McCulloch Room, MIT

Other participants

 Saul Amarel, Radio Corporation of America
 Ross Ashby, 
 Stafford Beer, United Steel Companies
 Ludwig von Bertalanffy
 Raymond Beurle, English Electric Valve Company
 Hewitt Crane, Stanford Research Institute, Menlo Park, California
 Joseph Hawkins
 Hans Oestriecher
 Gordon Pask
 Anatol Rapaport
 Charles Rosen
 Frank Rosenblatt
 Jack E. Steele
 Roger Sperry
 John Tooley
 David Willis
 Marshal Yovits

Two women participated, Kathy Forbes providing secretarial services and Cornelia Schaeffer of Athenium Publishers providing assistance in preparing the subsequent publication of the transactions of the symposium.

References

Cybernetics
University of Illinois Urbana-Champaign